The Nicastrese is an indigenous breed of domestic goat from Calabria, in southern Italy. It originates in the province of Catanzaro, and takes its name from the former town of Nicastro, which since 1968 has been part of Lamezia Terme. The Nicastrese is raised mainly in the area of origin, but also in the neighbouring provinces of Cosenza and Reggio Calabria. Photographic evidence suggests that it may be closely connected to the old "Araba" breed of the area.

The Nicastrese is one of the forty-three autochthonous Italian goat breeds of limited distribution for which a herdbook is kept by the Associazione Nazionale della Pastorizia, the Italian national association of sheep- and goat-breeders. The breed was officially recognised in June 2004.

Use

The average milk yield of the Nicastrese is  litres in 150 days for primiparous,  litres in 210 days for secondiparous, and  litres in 210 days for pluriparous, nannies. The milk averages 4.3% fat, 3.5% protein and 4.7% lactose.  It is used to make caprino cheeses such as the Giuncata di capra calabra, and mixed cheeses such as Cacioricotta and Canestrato, which in Calabria have PAT status, and Pecorino Crotonese, which has DOP status.

References

Goat breeds
Dairy goat breeds
Goat breeds originating in Italy